Philippe Beaussant (6 May 1930 – 8 May 2016) was a French musicologist and novelist, an expert on French baroque music, on which he has published widely. He was the founder of the Centre de Musique Baroque de Versailles, of which he was the artistic adviser of 1987 to 1996. He has also been a producer of musical programs for Radio France since 1974. His biography of Jean-Baptiste Lully, Lully ou le musicien du soleil (Éditions Gallimard, 1992), was the basis of the film Le Roi Danse (2000).

Beaussant won the 1993 Grand Prix du roman de l'Académie française for his novel Héloïse.

He was elected to seat 36 of the Académie française on 15 November 2007.

References

External links
Biography of Beaussant at the French-language publisher Librairie Arthème Fayard

1930 births
2016 deaths
Writers from Bordeaux
20th-century French novelists
20th-century French male writers
20th-century French musicologists
21st-century French musicologists
Members of the Académie Française
Grand Prix du roman de l'Académie française winners
Prix Goncourt de la Biographie winners
Chevaliers of the Légion d'honneur
Knights of the Ordre national du Mérite
Officiers of the Ordre des Arts et des Lettres
French male novelists